Niedernwöhren is a municipality in the district of Schaumburg, in Lower Saxony, Germany. It is situated approximately 5 km northwest of Stadthagen and 17 km northeast of Minden.

Niedernwöhren is the seat of the Samtgemeinde ("collective municipality") Niedernwöhren.

References

Schaumburg
Principality of Schaumburg-Lippe